Kishi (also Kushaiah) is a figure in the Old Testament. 1 Chronicles 6:44 states Kishi is a Merarite, and the father of the ancestor of Ethan the minstrel.

References

External links
The amazing name Kushaiah: meaning and etymology, Abarim Publications 

Books of Chronicles people